Spectrunculus crassus is a species of cusk-eel native to the Atlantic and eastern Pacific.

References 

Ophidiidae
Fish described in 1888